Chesson is a surname. Notable people with the surname include:

Surname
Frederick Chesson (1833–1888), English journalist and anti-slavery campaigner
Henry Chesson (1862–1948), Australian politician
James Chesson (born 1980), American racing driver
Jehu Chesson (born 1993), American football player
Lisa Chesson (born 1986), American ice hockey player
Nora Chesson (1871–1906), English poet
P. J. Chesson (born 1978), American race car driver
Thomas Chesson (1867–1943), Australian politician
Wes Chesson, American football player

Given name
Chesson Hadley (born 1987), American golfer

See also
Cesson
Rochesson